Ferenc Toma (22 March 1949 – 14 December 2011) was a Hungarian wrestler. He competed in the men's Greco-Roman 68 kg at the 1976 Summer Olympics.

References

External links
 

1949 births
2011 deaths
Hungarian male sport wrestlers
Olympic wrestlers of Hungary
Wrestlers at the 1976 Summer Olympics
Sportspeople from Békés County